Raheem Deterville (born 1 December 1999) is an Antiguan football midfielder who plays for Old Road. He has been capped by Antigua and Barbuda at international level.

Career statistics

References

External links

Living people
1999 births
Antigua and Barbuda international footballers
Antigua and Barbuda footballers
Association football midfielders
Antigua and Barbuda Premier Division players
Old Road F.C. players